Snežana Ristivojević-Dančetović (born 4 December 1957) is a Slovenian athlete. She competed in the women's long jump at the 1984 Summer Olympics, representing Yugoslavia.

References

External links
 

1957 births
Living people
Athletes (track and field) at the 1984 Summer Olympics
Slovenian female long jumpers
Yugoslav female long jumpers
Olympic athletes of Yugoslavia
Mediterranean Games silver medalists for Yugoslavia
Mediterranean Games gold medalists for Yugoslavia
Athletes (track and field) at the 1979 Mediterranean Games
Athletes (track and field) at the 1983 Mediterranean Games
Mediterranean Games medalists in athletics
Place of birth missing (living people)